Crystal Huang Yaoxi (born July 6, 1979) is an American table tennis player of Chinese origin.

Background
Huang earned a spot on the U.S. team for the 2008 Summer Olympics in Beijing, by placing first over Canada's Zhang Mo in the women's singles from the North American Qualification Tournament in Vancouver. Huang joined with her fellow players Wang Chen and five-time Olympian Gao Jun for the inaugural women's team event. She and her team placed second in the preliminary pool round, receiving a total of five points, two victories over the Netherlands and Nigeria, and a single defeat from the Singaporean trio Wang Yuegu, Li Jiawei, and Feng Tianwei. The U.S. team offered another shot for the bronze medal by defeating Romania in the first play-off, but lost their next match to South Korea, with a unanimous set score of 0–3. In the women's singles, Huang lost the preliminary round match to Congo's Yang Fen, attaining a set score of 2–4.

As of October 2010, Huang is ranked no. 196 in the world by the International Table Tennis Federation (ITTF). She is also left-handed, and uses the penhold grip. Huang currently resides with her family in San Gabriel, California, and obtains a dual citizenship.

References

External links
 
 
 
 NBC Olympics Profile

1979 births
Living people
American female table tennis players
Table tennis players at the 2008 Summer Olympics
Olympic table tennis players of the United States
American people of Chinese descent
Table tennis players from Hunan
People from San Gabriel, California
Sportspeople from California
Sportspeople from Changsha
Naturalised table tennis players
21st-century American women